The County of Amiens (also: Amiénois) was a feudal state centred on the city of Amiens, northern France, that existed from the 9th century until 1077 when the last count became a monk and the county reverted to the French crown. In 1185 the county was united with the French crown under King Philip II of France.

List of counts of Amiens 
 Richard (801-825) ancestor of the House of Buvinids
 Ermenfroi (before 895–919) also count of Vexin and Valois
 Ralph I of Gouy (915-926), also probably Count of Ostervant, from 923 also count of Valois and Vexin, possibly brother-in-law or son-in-law of Ermenfroi (first house of Valois)
 Ralph II of Vexin (Raoul de Cambrai) (926-944), Count of Valois, Amiens and Vexin, son of Ralph I.
 Odo of Vermandois (941-944), son of Count Herbert II of Vermandois, usurped the county in 941, ejected by royal troops in 944.
 Herluin (941-944), Count of Ponthieu (House of Montreuil)
 Walter I of Vexin (945-after 992), from 965 Count of Valois, Amiens and Vexin, probably son of Ralph I.
 Walter II of Vexin Le Blanc (before 998-after 1017), Count of Valois, Amiens and Vexin, from 1017 Count of Mantes, son of Walter I.
 Drogo (after 1017–1035), Count of Amiens, Mantes, Pontoise and Vexin, son of Walter II.
  (1035-1063), count of Amiens and Vexin, from 1063 titular count of Maine, son of Drogo
 Ralph IV (1063-1074) Count of Valois, Crépy and Vitry, from 1064 Count of Amiens and Vexin, avoué of  five abbeys (Saint-Denis, Jumièges, Saint-Wandrille, Saint-Pierre in Chartres and Saint-Arnoul in Crépy), son of Raoul III.
 Simon (1074-1077), died in 1080, Count of Amiens, Valois, Montdidier, Bar-sur-Aube, Vitry and Vexin, son of Raoul III. 

In 1077 Simon became a monk and his possessions were distributed. Valois went to his brother-in-law Herbert IV, Count of Vermandois, Amiens reverted to the French king Philip I while Vexin was divided between William, Duke of Normandy, and the king of France. Bar-sur-Aube and Vitry were occupied by Theobald, Count of Blois.

House of Boves 
 Enguerrand I (1085-1118), lord of Boves, Coucy and la Fère
 Thomas (1116-1118), died before 1131, his son, lord of Coucy, Marle, la Fère and Boves

Capetian House of Vermandois 
 Ralph I le Vaillant (1102–1152), Count of Valois, Vermandois, Amiens and Crépy, Seneschal of France (1131–1152), Regent of France in 1147

Bibliography

References

Amiens
Amienois